Scary Movie is an American horror comedy film series that comprises five parody films mainly focusing on spoofing horror films. The films have collectively grossed almost $900 million worldwide at the box office. The two recurring actresses are Anna Faris and Regina Hall as Cindy Campbell and Brenda Meeks, appearing in all installments except the fifth film. 

The franchise was developed by Keenen Ivory Wayans, Shawn Wayans, and Marlon Wayans, who wrote and directed the first two entries, with the latter two also starring. Produced by Dimension Films, the films saw distribution through Miramax Films (1–3) and The Weinstein Company (4–5).

Films

Scary Movie (2000) 

Scary Movie is the first film of the franchise. It was the highest-grossing film of the series, with $278,019,771 worldwide. It is a spoof of several films and television shows, with a primary focus on Scream and I Know What You Did Last Summer.

After a group of teenagers (consisting of Cindy Campbell (Anna Faris), Bobby Prinze (Jon Abrahams), Buffy Gilmore (Shannon Elizabeth), Greg Phillipe (Lochlyn Munro), Ray Wilkins (Shawn Wayans), and Brenda Meeks (Regina Hall) accidentally hit a man with their car, they decide to dump his body in a lake and never talk about it again. A year later someone wearing a Ghostface mask and robe kills them one by one.

Scary Movie 2 (2001) 

Scary Movie 2 is the second film of the franchise. It grossed $141,220,678 worldwide with $71,308,997 in the U.S. This is the last installment to receive an R-rating and also marks the end of the Wayans siblings' involvement with the franchise.

The film starts with a parody of The Exorcist, in which Megan Voorhees (sharing the same last name as the fictional serial killer Jason Voorhees) is possessed by Hugh Kane, and two priests, Father McFeely and Father Harris (James Woods and Andy Richter) have to force Hugh Kane out. But after Megan insults McFeely's mother he shoots her in the head.

Cindy, Brenda, Ray, and Shorty return in this film. Greg, Buffy, and Bobby are replaced by Buddy (Christopher Masterson), Theo (Kathleen Robertson), and Alex (Tori Spelling).

The film then merges into a parody of The Haunting with the story beginning when a perverted college professor, Professor Oldman (Tim Curry) and his wheel-chair bound assistant, Dwight (David Cross), plan to study ghosts inside a haunted mansion with the clueless teens as bait.

At the house, strange things happen: Ray gets attacked by a clown (whom he also rapes), Shorty gets attacked by a living marijuana plant, Cindy gets in a fight with a possessed cat, and Dwight gets into an argument with a foul-mouthed bird. When they find out about the professor's plan they try to escape the house, finding out that there is a ghost who still lives in the house. They must defeat the ghost in order to escape.

Scary Movie 3 (2003) 

Scary Movie 3 is the third film of the franchise. With $220,673,217 earned worldwide, it is the second most successful film in the series. The plot of the film is a spoof of The Ring and Signs as well as several other films and celebrities. Michael Jackson planned to sue the filmmakers for parodying him in such a way that made him seem like a child molester and having a fake nose. This was the first Scary Movie film to receive a PG-13 rating in the United States as well as the first to have no involvement from the Wayans family.

The film revolves around strange crop circles found near an old farm and the circulation of an unusual videotape. Upon watching this tape, the phone rings and a creepy voice says: "You're going to die in seven days". Cindy falls in love with a rapper named George (Simon Rex) (a parody of Jimmy "B-Rabbit" Smith Jr. of 8 Mile), when she hears that she is to die in seven days. Meanwhile, George and his older brother Tom (Charlie Sheen) - the farmers who discovered the crop circles in their corn field - learn that extraterrestrials are coming to Earth to destroy the killer responsible for the deaths of those who have watched the tape.

Scary Movie 4 (2006) 

Scary Movie 4 is the fourth film of the franchise. The film opened with $40 million at the weekend box office, making it the third best opening in the series. With a $178,049,620 at the worldwide box office, Scary Movie 4 ranks as the third highest grossing entry. The main target of spoof was War of the Worlds, Saw, The Village and The Grudge. The film concludes the story-arc that began with the first film and is also the last in the series to feature any of the original cast members.

Scary Movie 5 (2013) 

Scary Movie 5 is the fifth film of the franchise. It is the only film in the series to not feature Anna Faris and Regina Hall. The film was panned by critics and fans alike, and grossed $72,992,798 worldwide in the box office, thus being the least successful film in the franchise.

Jody (Ashley Tisdale) and Dan Sanders (Simon Rex) move into a new home after adopting three mysterious children. There are video cameras to record the events, and Jody and Dan soon discover that a powerful creature known as "Mama" is haunting them, trying to claim their newly adopted children.

Cast and crew
 A  indicates a performance through puppetry.
 A  indicates the actor or actress was uncredited for their role.
 A  indicates a performance through voice-work.

Principal cast

Additional crew

Production

Parodies 
Scary Movies main parodies are of Scream and I Know What You Did Last Summer, with elements of The Sixth Sense, The Matrix, and The Usual Suspects.

Scary Movie 2s primary target is The Haunting, while the rest of the film contains traces of The Exorcist, What Lies Beneath, Poltergeist, Titanic, The Amityville Horror, Hollow Man, and Charlie's Angels.

Scary Movie 3s general parodies are of The Ring and Signs. It also features elements of The Others, Airplane!, 8 Mile, The Matrix Reloaded, The Texas Chainsaw Massacre, and Minority Report.

Scary Movie 4s parodies are of the Saw films, The Village, The Grudge, and War of the Worlds, as well as Million Dollar Baby and Brokeback Mountain.

Scary Movie 5s central areas of satire are the Paranormal Activity films, Mama, Black Swan, and Rise of the Planet of the Apes. Other notable parodies are those of The Cabin in the Woods, Evil Dead, Fifty Shades of Grey, Inception, Sinister, and Madea.

Reception

Box office performance

Critical and public response

Music

Soundtracks 
 Scary Movie: Original Motion Picture Soundtrack (2000)
 Scary Movie 2: Original Motion Picture Soundtrack (2001)
 Scary Movie 3: Original Motion Picture Soundtrack (2003)
 Scary Movie 4: Original Motion Picture Soundtrack (2006)
 Scary Movie 5: Original Motion Picture Soundtrack (2013)

References

External links

Internet Movie Database

Box Office Mojo 
 Scary Movie Series Grosses at Box Office Mojo

Rotten Tomatoes

Metacritic 
 
 
 
 
 

 
American film series
American black comedy films
Comedy film series
Film series introduced in 2000
Horror film series
Parodies of horror